= A Thing of Magic =

2019 Marathi feature-film

- Directed by: Nithin Anil
- Cinematography: Priyadarsan N D
- Release date: 19 October 2019; undefined
- Running time: 100 minutes
- Country: India
- Language: Marathi

A Thing of Magic is a Marathi feature-film written, directed and produced by Nithin Anil.

== Plot ==
Gundu Kaakka is a struggling harmonium player, who aspires to join a local drama troupe. One day, after watching a 3D movie, he presents a pair of 3D glasses to his sisters, Pradnya and Pratheeksha. He tells them that the glasses give only him some magical powers. Though they initially refuse to believe him, an event soon raises the sisters' curiosity. The determined sisters set on a path to find out the truth about the glasses, along which tiny stories of the little village start to unfold.

== Production ==
A Thing of Magic was filmed by a crew of five members with a 60,000 rupees budget, paid by Anil in order to keep the creative control over the movie. The entire film's cast were first-time actors and residents of the village in Maharashtra where the story is set. The production team rented a house, which became an audition camp. They were approached, found, and brought to the set by knocking on doors on the day a particular scene was to be shot. Around a hundred people acted in the film. Most of the villagers had no idea about the process of film-making.
